O'Brien is an unincorporated community and census-designated place (CDP) in Josephine County, Oregon, United States. As of the 2010 census, O'Brien had a population of 504. The unemployment rate is 6.9%, slightly higher than the national average of 5.2%  The community was named after John O'Brien, who was one of the first settlers to arrive at the locality. In 2012, a small group started protecting the town when the police were cut due to budget cuts.

Infrastructure
The town consists of a few businesses at the intersection of Redwood Highway and Lone Mountain Road. These include Mann's O'Brien Country Store and Discount Gas, a post office with the zip code 97534, a fire station, the McGrew's restaurant, and the Lone Mountain RV Park. The Almost Heaven Member's Resort is located south of the other businesses, close to the California border. It is the southernmost town in Josephine county. To the east of O'Brien is the ghost town of Waldo, then further east is the unincorporated town of Takilma. To the north of O'Brien is the Illinois Valley's only city, Cave Junction, and further north are the towns of Kerby and Selma. To the northeast is the unincorporated Holland.

Geography
O'Brien is in southwestern Josephine County in the valley of the West Fork of the Illinois River, a north-flowing tributary of the Rogue River.

Demographics

Climate
O'Brien has a climate that is a Mediterranean (CSA) in nature with hot and dry summer days and cool and wet winters. It is also subtropical in nature due to its hot summer days, some of the hottest in Oregon, with temps often topping . Summer lows are very low in comparison to its highs.

References

Unincorporated communities in Josephine County, Oregon
Census-designated places in Oregon
Census-designated places in Josephine County, Oregon
Unincorporated communities in Oregon